Karl Wyss (born 6 December 1909, date of death unknown) was a Swiss modern pentathlete. He competed at the 1936 Summer Olympics.

References

External links
 

1909 births
Year of death missing
Swiss male modern pentathletes
Olympic modern pentathletes of Switzerland
Modern pentathletes at the 1936 Summer Olympics